List of parishes by province and commune for the Roman Catholic Diocese of Asti.

List of parishes for the Roman Catholic Diocese of Asti

Province of Alessandria

References

Asti